Kurodavolva is a genus of sea snails, marine gastropod mollusks in the family Ovulidae.

Species
Species within the genus Kurodavolva include:
Kurodavolva wakayamensis (Cate & Azuma, 1973)

References

Ovulidae
Monotypic gastropod genera
Gastropods described in 1987